"Born Country" is a song written by Byron Hill and John Schweers, and recorded by American country music band Alabama. It was released in December 1991 as the second and final single on their compilation album Greatest Hits Vol. II. It reached No. 1 on the Radio & Records chart in March 1992. It also reached number 2 on the Billboard Hot Country Songs charts, behind "Dallas" by Alan Jackson.

The single was one of three new tracks on Alabama's Greatest Hits Vol. II album (the other two being "Then Again" and "Hats Off") and was released in 1992 by RCA Nashville.  The song won an ASCAP Award for being among the most performed country songs of 1992.

The song was also recorded and released in April 1991 with an accompanying video by Ian Eaton & Battle River, of Saskatchewan, Canada.

Content
The song is a mid-tempo in which the narrator expresses his pride for the country.

Chart positions

Year-end charts

References

1992 singles
1991 songs
Alabama (American band) songs
Songs written by Byron Hill
Song recordings produced by Josh Leo
RCA Records singles
Songs written by John Schweers